24 Days is a French drama film directed by Alexandre Arcady released in 2014. It examines The Affair of the Gang of Barbarians of January 2006.

Synopsis

On a Friday night of January 2006, after Shabbat dinner with his mother (Zabou Breitman) and sister, 23-year-old Ilan Halimi (Syrus Shahidi) receives a phone call. Ilan quickly arranges to meet up with the caller, a beautiful young woman, and is subsequently attacked and kidnapped by a gang. The following afternoon, the Halimi family are sent a harrowing online message demanding a ransom for Ilan's return. Ilan's parents, Ruth and Didier Halimi (played by Pascal Elbé), immediately contact the police.

The police, failing to recognize the anti-Semitism behind the attack, treat Ilan's case as a normal kidnapping. The film depicts the next 24 days, in which the Halimi family receives over 700 threatening phone calls from Ilan's kidnappers. Tensions rise between the family and the police assigned to their case, as days go by without Ilan's safe return. Eventually, more is discovered about Ilan's kidnapper (Tony Harrisson Mpoudja), who seems to be in multiple places at once. The film is a chilling depiction of the real-life events surrounding the attack, and presents a commentary on growing anti-Semitism in France.

Cast
 Zabou Breitman as Ruth Halimi
 Pascal Elbé as Didier Halimi
 Jacques Gamblin as Commandant Delcour
 Sylvie Testud as Brigitte Farell
 Éric Caravaca as Lieutenant Fernandez
  as Ilan Halimi
  as Yaël Halimi
 Audrey Giacomini as Mony
  as Anne-Laure Halimi
 Olivier Sitruk as Raphy
 Kevin Elarbi as Karim
 Tony Harrisson Mpoudja as Youssouf Fofana
  as Jérôme Ribeiro
 Matthieu Boujenah as Johan
  as Lieutenant Dussault
 Emilie Caen as Lieutenant Barsac
  as Capitaine Garcin
 Sophie Tapie as Lieutenant Vogel
 Romain Guillaume as voice analysis investigator
 Alexis Michalik as Lieutenant Joubert
  as Emma

References

External links 

Antisemitism in France
French drama films
Crime films based on actual events
Films directed by Alexandre Arcady
2010s French films